Corunastylis ciliata, commonly known as the fringed midge orchid, is a small terrestrial orchid endemic to southern Australia. It has a single thin leaf fused to the flowering stem and up to fifteen small, green to greenish yellow flowers with purplish markings and a reddish purple labellum. It was formerly included with Corunastylis archeri, and C. ciliata is regarded as a synonym of Genoplesium archeri by the World Checklist of Selected Plant Families. Plants in this species have fewer, more erect flowers, a less-hairy labellum and have different coloration than C. archeri.

Description
As with others in the genus, the flowers are inverted so that the labellum is above the column rather than below it. There is a tapered callus in the centre of the labellum and extending almost to its tip. Flowering occurs from February to April.

Taxonomy and naming
The fringed midge orchid was first formally described in 1912 by Alfred Ewart and Bertha Rees and the description was published in the Proceedings of the Royal Society of Victoria. In 1989 David Jones and Mark Clements changed the name to Corunastylis ciliata. The specific epithet (ciliata) is from a Latin word cilium meaning "eyelash".

Distribution and habitat
Corunastylis ciliata grows in heath, grassy woodland and heathy forest in Victoria mostly west of Wilsons Promontory. In South Australia it grows in moist places in or near swamps and is found on Mount Compass and Mount Gambier.

References

ciliata
Endemic orchids of Australia
Orchids of Victoria (Australia)
Orchids of South Australia
Plants described in 1912